Calzada del Coto is a municipality located in the province of León, Castile and León, Spain. According to the 2010 census (INE), the municipality has a population of 260 inhabitants.

References

Municipalities in the Province of León